"Lamborghini" is the debut single by British YouTuber and rapper KSI. The song features a guest appearance from British rapper P Money. It was produced by DJ Turkish. The song was released for digital download and streaming on 23 March 2015 by Dcypha Productions as a standalone single. The song charted at number 30 in the United Kingdom and number 61 in Ireland. An accompanying music video was released on 25 March 2015. A remix to the song, titled Lambo Refuelled, was released on 8 January 2016 as a part of KSI's EP Keep Up  featuring Sway, Scrufizzer and Youngs Teflon.

Commercial performance 
The song entered the UK Singles Chart at number 30, making it KSI's seventh highest-charting single in the UK to date. It dropped to number 68 and number 96 over the following two weeks, before dropping out of the top 100. The song spent a total of six weeks on the UK R&B Singles Chart, peaking at number 7. KSI reacted to the commercial success of the song on Twitter, saying "thanks to everyone who listened to Lamborghini on Spotify and bought on iTunes!!! Didn't even think I would get in the top 40 man".

Music video
The music video, directed by Jak X, was filmed in London in February 2015 and was uploaded to KSI's YouTube channel on 25 March 2015. It has 112 million views, making it KSI's most-viewed music video to date. KSI's purple Lamborghini Aventador prominently appears in the music video.

Credits and personnel 
Credits adapted from Tidal.

KSI – vocals, songwriter
P Money – vocals, songwriter
Sway – songwriter
DJ Turkish – producer, songwriter

Charts

Release history

References

2015 songs
2015 debut singles
KSI songs
Songs written by KSI
Songs written by Sway (musician)
Songs written by P-Money